The Parsian Enghelab Hotel is a 250-room hotel in Tehran, Iran.

History 
The Royal Gardens Hotel opened in 1977. It was constructed by the prominent Iranian Jewish Berookhim family. The hotel's design was intended to reflect a Persian Garden. With the outbreak of the Iranian Revolution, the Royal Gardens Hotel was badly damaged by rioting mobs on November 5, 1978. The hotel was expropriated from the Berookhim family along with their other holdings in November 1979, and a member of the family, Ebrahim Berookhim, was executed by the revolutionary government in August 1980. The family filed a claim against the Iranian government with the Iran–United States Claims Tribunal for both actions.

After its expropriation, the hotel was renamed the Enghelab Hotel (meaning "Revolution" Hotel in Persian). It later become managed by the state-run Parsian International Hotels Co.

Facilities
The hotel has 2 restaurants one of which revolves.

References

External links

 Official Website

Hotel buildings completed in 1977
Hotels in Tehran
Hotels in Iran
Hotels established in 1977